Kevin J. Murphy is an American politician who served as city manager of Lowell, Massachusetts from 2014 to 2018 and from 1997 to 2014 was a member of the Massachusetts House of Representatives. Murphy is also an attorney and a member of the American Bar Association, Greater Lowell Bar Association, and the Massachusetts Bar Association.

Committee assignments
 Steering, Policy and Schedule
 Public Health Joint Committee
 Children, Families and Persons with Disabilities Joint Committee

Elections

2010

2008

See also
 Massachusetts House of Representatives' 18th Middlesex district

References

External links
 Massachusetts House of Representatives - Rep. Kevin Murphy
 Project Vote Smart legislative profile
 Project Vote Smart biography
 Campaign contributions: 2008, 2006, 2004, 2002, 2000, 1998

Living people
1952 births
Boston College alumni
City managers of Lowell, Massachusetts
Massachusetts lawyers
Democratic Party members of the Massachusetts House of Representatives
Suffolk University Law School alumni